Louis Favre may refer to:

 Louis Favre (engineer) (1826–1879), Swiss engineer
 Louis Favre (painter) (1892–1956), French painter, print maker, writer and inventor
 Louis Favre (French footballer) (1923–2008), French football player and manager
 Louis Favre (Switzerland footballer), Swiss football defender